Chinese red eggs (紅雞蛋) are bright pink coloured cooked chicken eggs used in Chinese cuisine. The eggs are first hard boiled before a wet red calligraphy paper is wiped over the eggs to create a pink coloring.

In Chinese culture, it is common to hold a red egg and ginger party at the baby's first-year birthday. Usually, the baby's name is announced to friends and family at this party.  One might find a bowl of brightly coloured cooked chicken eggs on the guests' buffet or serving tables, or the hosts might hand out the red-dyed eggs, symbolizing joy and renewed life. Sometimes the red eggs are also given to adult friends and family members for their birthdays.

Origin and folklore
Similar to Western Easter eggs, in Chinese culture eggs symbolize birth or a new start; thus, it is of paramount importance for eggs to be served to guests during an important birthday (such as the first month or first year). The color red symbolizes prosperity and good fortune to the Chinese.

Influence outside China

Mauritius 
In Mauritius, Sino-Mauritians continued the tradition of sharing red eggs to their family members to share the joy of a newborn; this tradition occurs in what is now called "baptême chinois" (literally translated as Chinese baptism).

See also 
 Smoked egg
 Tea egg

References 

Chinese cuisine
Vietnamese cuisine
Mauritian cuisine
Eggs (food)